The Sorelle Rocks (also called the Sorelle Reef and the Sorelli Rocks) are two submerged rocks approximately  west of the Galite Islands of Tunisia, at approximately .

HMS Avenger ran aground on the Sorelle Rocks in 1847 with great loss of life.

References

Landforms of Tunisia
Reefs of the Mediterranean Sea
Landforms of Africa